The following is a list of notable events and releases of the year 2019 in Danish music.

Events

January

February

March

April

May
 29 – The 21st Distortion festival starts in Copenhagen (May 29 - June 2).

June 
 6 – The NorthSide Festival opens in Aarhus (June 6 - 8).
 29 – The 48th Roskilde Festival opens (June 29 - July 5).

July 
 5 – The 41st Copenhagen Jazz Festival start in Copenhagen, Denmark (July 5 – 14).
 13 – The 31st Aarhus Jazz Festival starts in Aarhus, Denmark (July 13 – 20).

August

September

October

November

December

See also 
 2019 in Denmark
 Music of Denmark
 Denmark in the Eurovision Song Contest 2019

References

Danish music
Danish
Music